Sudhakar Yalamanchili from the Georgia Institute of Technology, Atlanta, GA was named Fellow of the Institute of Electrical and Electronics Engineers (IEEE) in 2014 for contributions to high-performance multiprocessor architecture and communication.

References

Fellow Members of the IEEE
Living people
Year of birth missing (living people)
Place of birth missing (living people)
Georgia Tech faculty